Elisabeth "Bep" Maria de Waard (born 8 May 1958) is a Netherlands Antillean windsurfer. She competed in the women's Lechner A-390 event at the 1992 Summer Olympics.

References

External Links
 

1958 births
Living people
Dutch Antillean windsurfers
Female windsurfers
Dutch Antillean female sailors (sport)
Olympic sailors of the Netherlands Antilles
Sailors at the 1992 Summer Olympics – Lechner A-390
Place of birth missing (living people)